Mount Cedric Wright is a  mountain summit located one mile west of the crest of the Sierra Nevada mountain range, in Fresno County of northern California, United States. The John Muir Trail traverses below the west aspect of this remote peak. The first ascent was made August 25, 1935, by Norman Clyde.

Etymology

The peak's name commemorates George Cedric Wright (1889–1959), an internationally known wilderness photographer of the Sierra Nevada, and Ansel Adams's mentor and close friend. The mountain's name was officially adopted in 1961 by the United States Board on Geographic Names. Park ranger Randy Morgenson scattered Wright's ashes on the slopes of his namesake mountain.

Climate
According to the Köppen climate classification system, Mount Cedric Wright is located in an alpine climate zone. Most weather fronts originate in the Pacific Ocean, and travel east toward the Sierra Nevada mountains. As fronts approach, they are forced upward by the peaks, causing them to drop their moisture in the form of rain or snowfall onto the range (orographic lift). Precipitation runoff from the mountain drains into Woods Creek, a tributary of the South Fork Kings River.

See also

 List of mountain peaks of California

References

External links

 Weather forecast: Mount Cedric Wright
 Mt. Cedric Wright photo: Flickr

Mountains of Fresno County, California
Mountains of Kings Canyon National Park
North American 3000 m summits
Mountains of Northern California
Sierra Nevada (United States)